Marche Polytechnic University or Polytechnic University of the Marches (Italian Università Politecnica delle Marche) is a public university in Ancona, Italy. It offers undergraduate and graduate degrees in Agriculture, Engineering, Economics, Medicine and Biology.

It was established in 1959 for research and education in various fields, including engineering, economics, medicine, and agriculture. 

UNIVPM offers undergraduate and graduate programs, including bachelor's and master's degrees in engineering, economics, architecture, medicine, and agriculture.

Academics
The teaching faculty currently numbers 710 teaching staff, along with 560 technical and administrative personnel. These are the 5 schools in which the university is divided into:

 School of Agriculture
 School of Economics
 School of Engineering
 School of Medicine and Surgery
 School of Sciences

.

See also 
 List of Italian universities
 List of universities in Europe founded after 1945

References

External links
Marche Polytechnic University Website 

Universities in Italy
Ancona
Educational institutions established in 1969
1969 establishments in Italy
Education in Marche